Šauliai may refer to:

Lithuanian Riflemen's Union
,  neighborhood of Klaipėda, Lithuania
, a locality in Šalčininkai District Municipality, Lithuania
 A locality in Pagėgiai Municipality, Lithuania